Kienstra (also Kienstra Store) is a ghost town located in Adams County, Mississippi, United States.  South of the town was Kienstra Landing, located on the Mississippi River.

The community was situated on a barren peninsula called "Jackson Point", at a bend in the river called "Palmetto Bend", named for the palmetto plant which grew abundantly in the hardwood swamps across the river in Louisiana.

Kienstra had a post office from 1871 to 1957.  The Morrisana Plantation was located at Kienstra.  North of the town, midway to Arnot, was the Kienstra School.  The "Kienstra Store Light" was a navigation beacon on the river, located near the landing as early as 1879.

In 1900, Kienstra had a population of 35.

References

Former populated places in Adams County, Mississippi
Mississippi populated places on the Mississippi River
Former populated places in Mississippi